This is a list of defunct airlines of Sierra Leone.

See also

 List of airlines of Sierra Leone
 List of airports in Sierra Leone

References

Sierra Leone
Airlines
Airlines, defunct